Neuburg-Schrobenhausen is a Landkreis (district) in Bavaria, Germany. It is bounded by (from the east and clockwise) the districts of Pfaffenhofen, Aichach-Friedberg, Donau-Ries and Eichstätt, and by the city of Ingolstadt.

History
The district was established in 1972 by merging the former districts of Neuburg and Schrobenhausen.

Geography

The district consists of the previously swampy areas between the Danube and Paar rivers, that are called the Donaumoos. North of the Danube the district includes a small part of the Altmühl Valley Nature Park.

Coat of arms
The coat of arms displays:
 the bear's head from the city arms of Schrobenhausen
 the heraldic lion of the Electorate of the Palatinate
 a wavy line symbolising the Danube River

Towns and municipalities

References

External links

Official website (German)

 
Districts of Bavaria